Saint-Jean-Baptiste is a municipality in the Montérégie region of  Quebec, a Canadian province. The population as of the Canada 2011 Census was 3,191. It is located within La Vallée-du-Richelieu Regional County Municipality in a valley between Mont Saint-Hilaire and Mont Rougemont.

On November 4, 1998 it moved from Rouville Regional County Municipality to La Vallée-du-Richelieu Regional County Municipality.

Demographics

Population
Population trend:

Education

The South Shore Protestant Regional School Board previously served the municipality.

Language
Mother tongue language (2006)

Photo gallery

See also
List of municipalities in Quebec

References

External links

Municipalité Saint-Jean-Baptiste

Municipalities in Quebec
Incorporated places in La Vallée-du-Richelieu Regional County Municipality